Yuliya Yakunovna Allagulova (born June 25, 1972) is a Russian short track speed skater who competed for the Unified Team in the 1992 Winter Olympics.

In 1992 she was a member of the relay team for the Unified Team which won the bronze medal in the 3000 metre relay competition.

External links
 profile

1972 births
Living people
Russian female short track speed skaters
Olympic short track speed skaters of the Unified Team
Soviet female short track speed skaters
Short track speed skaters at the 1992 Winter Olympics
Olympic bronze medalists for the Unified Team
Olympic medalists in short track speed skating
Medalists at the 1992 Winter Olympics